Doll Peak is a peak rising to  in the northwest part of the Ravens Mountains, Britannia Range. It was named after Brigadier General Karl H. Doll, who served as Director of Operations of the 109th Tactical Airlift Group and was instrumental in early transition planning of the LC-130 operations from the U.S. Navy to the Air National Guard.

References 

Mountains of Oates Land